Rudolf Rominger (21 August 1908 – 8 November 1979) was a Swiss alpine skier. He won several World Championship titles.

External links
 

1908 births
1979 deaths
Swiss male alpine skiers